In linguistics, a possessive affix (from ) is an affix (usually suffix or prefix) attached to a noun to indicate its possessor, much in the manner of possessive adjectives.

Possessive affixes are found in many languages of the world. The World Atlas of Language Structures lists 642 languages with possessive suffixes, possessive prefixes, or both out of a total sample of 902 languages. Possessive suffixes are found in some Austronesian, Uralic, Altaic, Semitic, and Indo-European languages. Complicated systems are found in the Uralic languages; for example, Nenets has 27 (3×3×3) different types of forms distinguish the possessor (first-, second- or third-person), the number of possessors (singular, dual or plural) and the number of objects (singular, dual or plural). That allows Nenets-speakers to express the phrase "we two's many houses" in one word. Mayan languages and Nahuan languages also have possessive prefixes.

Uralic languages

Finnish
Finnish  uses possessive suffixes. The number of possessors and their person can be distinguished for the singular and plural except for the third person. However, the construction hides the number of possessed objects when the singular objects are in nominative or genitive case and plural objects in nominative case since käteni may mean either "my hand" (subject or direct object), "of my hand" (genitive) or "my hands" (subject or direct object). For example, the following are the forms of talo (house), declined to show possession:

The grammatical cases are not affected by the possessive suffix except for the accusative case (-n or unmarked), which is left unmarked by anything other than the possessive suffix. The third-person suffix is used only if the possessor is the subject. For example, Mari maalasi talonsa "Mari painted her house", cf. the use of the genitive case in Toni maalasi Marin talon "Toni painted Mari's house". (The -n on the word talon is the accusative case, which is pronounced the same as the genitive case.)

For emphasis or clarification, the possessor can be given outside the word as well, using the genitive case. In this case, the possessive suffix remains. For example, my house can be taloni or minun taloni in which minun is the genitive form of the first-person singular pronoun.

Omission of the possessive suffix makes it possible to distinguish the plural for the possessed objects, but that is not considered proper language: mun käsi "my hand" vs. mun kädet "my hands". Systematic omission of possessive suffixes is found in Spoken Finnish, wherever a pronoun in the genitive is used, but that is found only in direct address: "Their coats are dry" is Niiden takit on kuivia (niiden lit. "they's"). That can be contrasted with indirect possession, as in "They took their coats", in which the possessive suffix is used: Ne otti takkinsa. Even in proper Finnish, the pronouns sen and niiden, which are the demonstrative as well as inanimate forms of hänen and heidän, do not impose possessive suffixes except indirectly. It would be hypercorrect to say niiden talonsa. There is also a distinction in meaning in the third person on whether or not the third-person possessive pronoun is used:
He ottivat (omat) takkinsa. = "They took their (own) coats." (The possessor cannot be mentioned, even for emphasis, when it the same as the subject.)
He ottivat heidän takkinsa. = "They took their (others') coats." (When a third person pronoun is mentioned as the possessor, it must refer to someone other than the subject of the sentence.)
He kertoivat tekevänsä (itse). = "They told they would come (themselves)." (The doer cannot be mentioned, even for emphasis, when it is the same as previously.)
He kertoivat heidän tulevan. = "They told they (others) would come." (When a third person pronoun is mentioned as the subject of the second sentence, it must refer to someone other than the subject of the first sentence.)

Hungarian
Hungarian is another Uralic language. Distantly related to Finnish, Hungarian follows similar rule as given above for Finnish, except that it does not use genitive case for emphasis. To say, "Maria's house," one would say Mária háza (literally "Maria his house", "where háza means "her/his/its house").

See also Possessive suffixes in the article Hungarian grammar (noun phrases).

Semitic languages

Arabic
Arabic, a Semitic language, uses personal suffixes, also classified as enclitic pronouns, for the genitive and accusative cases of the personal pronouns. The genitive and accusative forms are identical, except for the 1st person singular, which is -ī in genitive and -nī in accusative case. They can be used with nouns, expressing possession, with prepositions, which require the genitive case, or with verbs, expressing the object. Examples for personal suffixes expressing possession, using the word بيت bayt(u) (house) as a base:

Hebrew
In Hebrew, a Northwest Semitic language, possessive suffixes are optional. They are more common in formal, archaic, or poetic language and for certain nouns than on others. For instance, my home can be written בֵּיתִי (beiti). However, the following are some different ways to express possession, using the word בַּיִת (bayit, house) as a base:

my house: בֵּיתִי beiti (house-my), הַבַּיִת שֶׁלִּי ha-bayit sheli (the-house of-me)
your (masc., sing.) house: בֵּיתְךָ beitkha (house-your), הַבַּיִת שֶׁלְּךָ ha-bayit shelkha (the-house of-you)
Adam's house: בֵּית אָדָם beit Adam (house-of Adam), בֵּיתוֹ שֶׁל אָדָם beito shel Adam (house-his of Adam), הַבַּיִת שֶׁל אָדָם ha-bayit shel Adam (the-house of Adam)

Assyrian
In Assyrian Neo-Aramaic, a Modern Aramaic language, possessive pronouns are suffixes that are attached to the end of nouns to express possession similar to the English pronouns my, your, his, her, etc., which reflects the gender and the number of the person or persons.

Although possessive suffixes are more convenient and common, they can be optional for some people and seldom used, especially among those with the Tyari and Barwari dialects. The following are the alternative ways to express possession, using the word "bĕtā" (house) as a base:

my house: bĕtā it dēyi ("house of mine")
your (masc., sing.) house: bĕtā it dēyūkh ("house of yours")
your (fem., sing.) house: bĕtā it dēyakh 
your (plural) house: bĕtā it dēyōkhūn ("house of yours")
3rd person (masc., sing.): bĕtā it dēyū ("house of his")
3rd person (fem., sing.): bĕtā it dēyō ("house of hers")
3rd person (plural): bĕtā it dēyĕh ("house of theirs")

Indo-European languages

Armenian
In Armenian, the following suffixes are used (Eastern standard):

Persian 
Persian, an Indo-European language, has possessive suffixes:

e.g. pedar-am my father; barâdar-aš his/her brother

Central Morocco Tamazight 
Central Morocco Tamazight's use of possessive suffixes mirrors that of many other Afro-Asiatic languages.

 -inw is used when the noun ends in a consonant

('mine').

Turkish
Possessive forms of the noun ev ("house"):

Additionally, when suffixed to a plural form, the plural suffix -leri is replaced by -i, so "their houses" is not *evlerleri but just also evleri, making this form triply ambiguous.

The Turkish possessive suffixes obey vowel harmony (ok – "arrow"; okum – "my arrow"; okları – "their arrow" or "his/her/their arrows"). If the word to which they are attached ends on a vowel, an initial vowel of the possessive suffix is elided (baba – "father"; babam – "my father").

Malay
In Malay, an Austronesian language, the following suffixes can be added to nouns to indicate possession.

Not all pronouns are added in this way; most are written as separate words. For example, your country can also be expressed as negara anda or negara engkau, and our country as negara kita (if the reader is included) or negara kami (if the reader is excluded).

Classical Nahuatl
Classical Nahuatl, an Uto-Aztecan language, uses possessive prefixes.

See also
 Possessive apostrophe
 Possessive case

References

   Johanna Laakso. Uralilaiset kansat. Tietoa suomen sukukielistä ja niiden puhujista. WSOY 1991.

Affixes